KCYM-LD, virtual channel 44 (UHF digital channel 26), is a low-powered television station licensed to Des Moines, Iowa, United States. The station is owned by HC2 Holdings, as part of a duopoly with KAJR-LD (channel 36). The station broadcasts its digital signal from a transmitter located near Baxter.

Digital channels

References

External links
DTV America

Low-power television stations in the United States
Innovate Corp.
Television channels and stations established in 2016
CYM-LD